Anastasia Sergeyevna Lobach (born 25 June 1987 in Minsk), née Anastasia Kamenshykova, is a Belarusian handballer who plays for Rostov-Don and the Belarus national team.

Personal life
During the 2020 Belarusian protests, Lobach and several other Belarusian handball players appealed to the authorities calling for an end to violence against protesters.

International honours  
EHF Champions League: 
Bronze Medalist: 2017, 2018

EHF Cup Winners' Cup: 
Silver Medalist: 2014

Individual awards
 Top Scorer of the Belarusian Championship: 2011 
 Best Defence Player of the Baia Mare Champions Trophy: 2014

References
 

  

1987 births
Living people
Sportspeople from Minsk
Belarusian female handball players
Expatriate handball players 
Belarusian expatriate sportspeople in Ukraine
Belarusian expatriate sportspeople in Russia
Belarusian expatriate sportspeople in Romania 
CS Minaur Baia Mare (women's handball) players